Msoki (Hebrew: מסוקי) is a Jewish soup traditional to Algerian and Tunisian Jews, and is most often eaten during feasts and in most, during the celebration of Passover.

References

Algerian soups
Sephardi Jewish cuisine
Israeli cuisine
Jewish cuisine
Tunisian cuisine
Maghrebi cuisine
Passover foods